Bergsig is the name of several neighbourhoods in Southern Africa.

In South Africa
 Bersig, neighbourhood in Caledon, Western Cape
 Bersig, neighbourhood in Calitzdorp
 Bersig, neighbourhood in Laingsburg, Western Cape
 Bersig, neighbourhood in Montagu, Western Cape
 Bersig, neighbourhood in Moorreesburg
 Bersig, neighbourhood in Queenstown, Eastern Cape
 Bersig, neighbourhood in Worcester, Western Cape

In Namibia
 Bergsig, a hamlet in Kunene Region near the mouth of the Koigab River